The rufous sibia (Heterophasia capistrata) is a rare species of bird in the family Leiothrichidae. It feeds on berries and insects.

It is found in the northern parts of the Indian subcontinent, ranging across India, Nepal and Bhutan. Its natural habitat is the temperate forests of the Lower to Middle Himalayas. The species has an unmistakable appearance with its rufous-dominated colouration and black head, and is often seen with its crest raised.  It is a vigorous, melodious singer.

Gallery

References

Collar, N. J. & Robson C. 2007. Family Timaliidae (Babblers)  pp. 70 – 291 in; del Hoyo, J., Elliott, A. & Christie, D.A. eds. Handbook of the Birds of the World, Vol. 12. Picathartes to Tits and Chickadees. Lynx Edicions, Barcelona.

rufous sibia
Birds of the Himalayas
rufous sibia
Taxonomy articles created by Polbot